James C. Klotter is an American historian who has served as the State Historian of Kentucky since 1980. Klotter is also a history professor at Georgetown College and one of the co-authors of Kentucky's staple history book, A New History of Kentucky. 

Klotter received a Ph.D. in History from the University of Kentucky, and he has been awarded honorary degrees from Eastern Kentucky University and Union College. Klotter was the executive director of the Kentucky Historical Society for many years, and he was an associate editor of the Kentucky Encyclopedia. In 2015, the Boyd County High School chapter of the Rho Kappa National Social Studies Honor Society was named in his honor. In 2022, has was inducted into the Kentucky Writers Hall of Fame for 2022 by the Carnegie Center for Literacy and Learning.

As of 2017, Klotter lives with his wife in Lexington, Kentucky.

Major works
William Goebel: The Politics of Wrath. Lexington, Kentucky. 1977.
A New History of Kentucky. University Press of Kentucky. Lexington, Kentucky. 1997.
A Concise History of Kentucky.
History Mysteries.
Kentucky: Portrait in Paradox, 1900-1950. 
Kentucky Justice, Southern Honor, and American Manhood: Understanding the Life and Death of Richard Reid. 
The Breckinridges of Kentucky. 
Faces of Kentucky. 
Genealogies of Kentucky Families, from the Register of the Kentucky Historical Society. Volume O – Y. 
Appalachian Ghost Stories: Tales from Bloody Breathitt. Klotter wrote the foreword.

References

External links

Year of birth missing (living people)
Living people
21st-century American historians
21st-century American male writers
Writers from Lexington, Kentucky
History of Kentucky
Georgetown College (Kentucky) alumni
University of Kentucky alumni
American male non-fiction writers